WYSZ (89.3 FM) is a radio station licensed to Maumee, Ohio. It is the flagship for Yes! FM, a non-profit, Christian CHR radio station in Toledo, Ohio. WYSZ's tower is located near the intersection of Nebraska Avenue and McCord Road in Springfield Township, west of US 23.

Translators

References

External links

YSZ
YSZ
1992 establishments in Ohio
Radio stations established in 1992